Shabtai Daniel (born Shabtai Don-Yichye in 1909, died 19 December 1981) was an Israeli journalist and politician who briefly served as a member of the Knesset for the National Religious Party in 1965.

Biography
Born in Viļaka in the Russian Empire (today in Latvia), Don-Yihye made aliyah to Mandatory Palestine in 1931. He studied at the Mercaz HaRav yeshiva and the Hebrew University of Jerusalem. After being certified as a teacher he worked in Kfar Yabetz and Kfar Hasidim.

A member of Hapoel HaMizrachi, he was amongst the founders of the party's HaTzofe newspaper and a member of its editorial board from its foundation. In 1948 he became its editor, remaining in post until 1981. He was on the National Religious Party list for the 1965 elections, and entered the Knesset after the party won 11 seats. However, he resigned after nine days, and was replaced by Frija Zoaretz.

He died in 1981.

References

External links
 

1909 births
1981 deaths
People from Balvi Municipality
People from Lyutsinsky Uyezd
Latvian Jews
Soviet emigrants to Mandatory Palestine
Jews in Mandatory Palestine
Israeli people of Latvian-Jewish descent
National Religious Party politicians
Hapoel HaMizrachi politicians
Members of the 6th Knesset (1965–1969)
Israeli educators
Israeli journalists
Mercaz HaRav alumni
Hebrew University of Jerusalem alumni
Burials at Nahalat Yitzhak Cemetery
20th-century journalists